The Owl's Map is an album by Jim Jupp, under the pseudonym of Belbury Poly. The album was released on 10 September 2006 on the Ghost Box Music label.

Track listing

External links
 Ghost Box Music
 Stylus Magazine review of The Owl's Map
 frieze.com review of The Owl's Map

2006 albums
Belbury Poly albums
Ghost Box Music albums